The 2015 City of York Council election took place on 7 May 2015 to elect members of City of York Council in England. The whole council was up for election. Turnout was substantially up across the city due to the election being held on the same day as the general election and other local elections in England.

Since the previous election in 2011 a review of ward boundaries had affected some wards, although the total number of councillors remained at 47. The following wards remained unchanged from 2011: Acomb, Bishopthorpe, Dringhouses and Woodthorpe, Haxby and Wigginton, Holgate, Huntington and New Earswick, Micklegate, Strensall, Westfield and Wheldrake. All other wards saw boundary changes and a new ward, Copmanthorpe, was created from the former Rural West York Ward.

The election saw heavy losses for the ruling Labour Party, which had won overall control of the council in 2011, losing more than 40% of the 26 seats won at the previous election. Several senior Labour councillors were defeated including the party's deputy leader Tracey Simpson-Laing and Cabinet members Dave Merrett and Linsay Cunningham. The Conservatives, Liberal Democrats and Greens all made gains and two Independent councillors were also elected. A record number of new councillors were elected, almost half of the entire Council, with the York Press reporting that "of the 47 seats contested, 25 were won by candidates with council experience while 22 were won by debutants." Following talks between the political groups after the election, the Conservatives and Liberal Democrats agreed to run the Council as a joint administration.

Election result

 There were boundary changes in 13 wards, which elected 28 city councillors. There were no boundary changes in 8 wards, which elected 19 city councillors.

Ward results

Acomb ward

 * Represented the Acomb ward of City of York Council, 19992015

Bishopthorpe ward
The parishes of Acaster Malbis and Bishopthorpe

 There were no boundary changes to Bishopthorpe ward. 
 * Represented the Copmanthorpe ward of City of York Council, 19992003,  and the Bishopthorpe ward of City of York Council, 20072015  
 † Represented the Holgate ward of York City Council, 19921996,  and the Holgate ward of City of York Council, 19952003

Clifton ward

 * Represented the Bootham ward of York City Council, 19821996,  the Fishergate division of North Yorkshire County Council, 19851989,  the Bootham ward of City of York Council, 19952003,   and the Clifton ward of City of York Council, 20032015   
 † Represented the Clifton ward of City of York Council, 20032015

Copmanthorpe ward
The parish of Copmanthorpe

 * Represented the Acomb ward of York City Council, 19861996,  and the Acomb ward of City of York Council, 19952015

Dringhouses and Woodthorpe ward

 

 There were no boundary changes to Dringhouses and Woodthorpe ward. 
 * Represented the Foxwood ward of York City Council, 19901996,  the Foxwood ward of City of York Council, 19952003,   and the Dringhouses and Woodthorpe ward of City of York Council, 20032015   
 † Represented the Dringhouses and Woodthorpe ward of City of York Council, 20112015

Fishergate ward

 * Represented the Fishergate ward of City of York Council, 20032015   
 † Represented the Fishergate ward of City of York Council, 20072015

Fulford and Heslington ward
The parish of Fulford and part of the parish of Heslington

 * Represented the Fulford ward of City of York Council, 20032015

Guildhall ward

 * Represented the Guildhall division of North Yorkshire County Council, 19851996,  and the Guildhall ward of City of York Council, 19952015     
 † Represented the Acomb ward of York City Council, 19791984, the Guildhall ward of York City Council, 19881996,  the Acomb division of North Yorkshire County Council, 19811989,  and the Guildhall ward of City of York Council, 19952015

Haxby and Wigginton ward
The parishes of Haxby and Wigginton

 There were no boundary changes to Haxby and Wigginton ward. 
 * Represented the Strensall ward of City of York Council, 20032007,  and the Haxby and Wigginton ward of City of York Council, 20112015 
 † Represented the Haxby and Wigginton ward of City of York Council, 20112015 
 ‡ Represented the Holgate ward of City of York Council, 20072011

Heworth ward

 * Represented the Heworth ward of City of York Council, 20092015  
 † Represented the Heworth ward of City of York Council, 20072015  
 ‡ Represented the Westfield ward of City of York Council, 20112015

Heworth Without ward
The parish of Heworth Without

 * Represented the Heworth Without ward of City of York Council, 20072015

Holgate ward

 * Represented the Holgate ward of City of York Council, 20072015  
 † Represented the Wheldrake ward of City of York Council, 20032011

Hull Road ward
Part of the parish of Heslington

 * Represented the Hull Road ward of City of York Council, 20112015 
 † Represented the Heslington ward of City of York Council, 20112015

Huntington and New Earswick ward
The parishes of Huntington and New Earswick

 There were no boundary changes to Huntington and New Earswick ward. 
 * Represented the Huntington and New Earswick ward of City of York Council, 20032015   
 † Represented the Huntington and New Earswick ward of City of York Council, 19992015

Micklegate ward

 There were no boundary changes to Micklegate ward. 
 * Represented the Micklegate ward of City of York Council, 20072015  
 † Represented the Bishophill ward of York City Council, 19821996,  the Bishophill ward of City of York Council, 19952003,   and the Micklegate ward of City of York Council, 20032015   
 ‡ Represented the Rural West York ward of City of York Council, 20072015  
 § Represented the Holgate ward of City of York Council, 20032007

Osbaldwick and Derwent ward
The parishes of Dunnington, Holtby, Kexby, Murton, and Osbaldwick

 * Represented the Derwent ward of City of York Council, 20072015  
 † Represented the Osbaldwick ward of City of York Council, 20112015 
 ‡ Represented the Fishergate division of North Yorkshire County Council, 19891993

Rawcliffe and Clifton Without ward
The parishes of Clifton Without and Rawcliffe

 * Represented the Skelton, Rawcliffe, and Clifton Without ward of City of York Council, 20112015 
 † Represented the Rawcliffe and Skelton ward of City of York Council, 19992003,  and the Skelton, Rawcliffe, and Clifton Without ward of City of York Council, 20032007

Rural West York ward
The parishes of Askham Bryan, Askham Richard, Hessay, Nether Poppleton, Rufforth with Knapton, Skelton, and Upper Poppleton

 * Represented the Rural West York ward of City of York Council, 20072015  
 † Represented the Rural West York ward of City of York Council, 20112015 
 ‡ Represented the Skelton, Rawcliffe, and Clifton Without ward of City of York Council, 20032011

Strensall ward
The parishes of Earswick, Stockton-on-the-Forest, and Strensall with Towthorpe 

 There were no boundary changes to Strensall ward. 
 * Represented the Strensall ward of City of York Council, 20112015 
 † Represented the Clifton ward of City of York Council, 20072015  
 ‡ Represented the Haxby West ward of Ryedale District Council, 19871996

Westfield ward

 There were no boundary changes to Westfield ward. 
 * Represented the Westfield ward of York City Council, 19941996,  and the Westfield ward of City of York Council, 19992011    and 20142015
 † Represented the Westfield ward of City of York Council, 20112015

Wheldrake ward
The parishes of Deighton, Elvington, Naburn, and Wheldrake

 There were no boundary changes to Wheldrake ward.

References

2015 English local elections
May 2015 events in the United Kingdom
2015
2010s in York